Yu Hui (born 31 March 1980 in Qingdao, Shandong) is a Chinese archer.

She competed at the 2002 Asian Games where she won a bronze medal in the team event and at the 2006 Asian Games where she won a silver medal in the event.

She also competed at the 2000 Summer Olympics.

References

1980 births
Living people
Chinese female archers
Archers at the 2000 Summer Olympics
Olympic archers of China
Place of birth missing (living people)
Asian Games medalists in archery
Archers at the 2002 Asian Games
Archers at the 2006 Asian Games
Sportspeople from Qingdao
World Archery Championships medalists
Asian Games silver medalists for China
Asian Games bronze medalists for China
Medalists at the 2006 Asian Games
Medalists at the 2002 Asian Games
21st-century Chinese women